Saliana chiomara is a butterfly in the family Hesperiidae. It is found from Panama to the Brazilian states of Pará and Amazonas.

References

Butterflies described in 1867
Hesperiinae
Hesperiidae of South America
Butterflies of Central America
Taxa named by William Chapman Hewitson